Dumler is a surname. Notable people with the surname include:

Carmen Lozano Dumler (1921–2015), Puerto Rican soldier
Cornelia Dumler (born 1982), German volleyball player
Doug Dumler (born 1950), American football player

See also
Dummer (surname)